Bezovo is a village in Municipality of Struga, North Macedonia.

Population
The current population is 54:
 Macedonians 53
 Others 1

References

Villages in Struga Municipality